Mangal Sen (1915–1972) was a Punjabi writer, poet and essayist in East Punjab, India. He wrote first under the name Balwant Rai, but is most famous for his poetry under his pen name Bawa Balwant. He started writing poetry in Urdu but later switched to his mother tongue of Punjabi. Balwant is credited with helping start the progressive movement in Punjabi poetry. He also made a contribution to the freedom struggle of India.

Early life 

Mangal Sen was born in August 1915 to a middle-class family, in the ancient village of Neshta in the Indian Punjab. Neshta is near Wagah border and now falls under the Amritsar district He received his primary education from his father, Thakur Dina Nath, and learned Hindi, Urdu and Sanskrit. He got a job in Amritsar where he developed a passion for music. He was heavily influenced by the Urdu poet Muhammad Iqbal.

His father, Thakur Dina Nath, was a hakeem (English:desi doctor). He had two brothers and two sisters. His brothers was unmarried while his marriage was followed by a quick separation. Sujan Singh, a noted story writer of Punjab, was one of his close friends.

Literary works 

Greatly influenced by Mohammad Iqbal, he started writing Urdu poetry and later switched over to his mother tongue, Punjabi. His first book in Urdu, Sher-E-Hind, was banned by the British administration. His poetic collections include Amar Geet, Maha Nach, Jwalamukhi, Sugand-Sameer and Bandergah. He published one essay collection, Kis Taraan De Naach.

Legacy 

He died due to the heat of June in 1972 in New Delhi. Today, except his literal works, nothing belonging to him is traceable. Neshta, the Punjab's most ancient village lies neglected with his house ruined. His two sisters are unknown. Nobody knows where they live.

References 

Punjabi-language poets
Punjabi-language writers
Punjabi people
1915 births
1972 deaths
20th-century Indian poets
Poets from Punjab, India
Indian male poets
20th-century Indian male writers